Wordsworth Donisthorpe (24 March 1847 – 30 January 1914) was an English barrister, individualist anarchist and inventor, pioneer of cinematography and chess enthusiast.

Life and work 
Donisthorpe was born in Leeds, on 24 March 1847. His father was George E. Donisthorpe, also an inventor; his brother, Horace Donisthorpe, was a myrmecologist. He studied at Leeds Grammar School and Trinity College, Cambridge. Donisthorpe married Ann Maria Anderson on 17 December 1873; he and his wife later separated and he had a daughter with Edith Georgina Fleming (whom he described as his second wife) in 1911.

In 1885, Donisthorpe was co-founder of the British Chess Association and the British Chess Club.

Donisthorpe spoke on anarchism at a conference organised by the Fabian Society in 1886. He was associated with the Liberty and Property Defence League and edited their Jus journal until his split from the League in 1888.

Donisthorpe filed for a patent in 1876, for a film camera, which he named a "kinesigraph." The object of the invention was to: 

According to Donisthorpe, he produced a model of this camera around the late 1870s. In 1890 he also produced, together with his cousin W. C. Crofts, a moving picture of London's Trafalgar Square. The camera that produced this moving picture was patented in 1889 along with the projector necessary to show the motion frames.

In 1893, Donisthorpe was one of the founding members and President of the children's rights and free love advocacy organisation the Legitimation League; he left the organization in 1897.

On 30 January 1914, Donisthorpe died of heart failure at Shottermill, Surrey.

Bibliography

References

Works online 
 The claims of labour, or, Serfdom, Wagedom, and Freedom (1880).
 Labour capitalization (1887).
 Individualism: A System of Politics (1889).
 "The Woes of an Anarchist", Liberty (25 January 1890). Reprinted in Benjamin Tucker, Instead of a Book (1897).
 "L'État Est Mort; Vive L'État!", Liberty (23 May 1890). Reprinted in Benjamin Tucker, Instead of a Book (1897).
 Law in a Free State (1895).

External links
 

1847 births
1914 deaths
19th-century chess players
Alumni of Trinity College, Cambridge
Cinema pioneers
English anarchists
English chess players
English cinematographers
English inventors
Game players from Yorkshire
Individualist anarchists
People from Leeds
Pioneers of photography